The A. Landi General Merchandise Building is a historic commercial building on Arkansas Highway 8 near Eudora, Arkansas in the village of Grand Lake.  Built c. 1920, it is a single story wood-frame building with Plain Traditional styling, including a central section on its main facade with a raised parapet section over the centered entrance.  The building is significant for its association with the Landi family, one of a small number of Italian immigrants to remain in the area after the plantation economy collapsed.

The building was listed on the National Register of Historic Places in 1992.

See also
National Register of Historic Places listings in Chicot County, Arkansas

References

Commercial buildings on the National Register of Historic Places in Arkansas
Buildings and structures in Chicot County, Arkansas
National Register of Historic Places in Chicot County, Arkansas